The men's 500 metres in short track speed skating at the 1994 Winter Olympics took place on 24 and 26 February at the Hamar Olympic Amphitheatre.

Results

Heats
The first round was held on 24 February. There were eight heats, with the top two finishers moving on to the quarterfinals.

Heat 1

Heat 2

Heat 3

Heat 4

Heat 5

Heat 6

Heat 7

Heat 8

Quarterfinals
The top two finishers in each of the four quarterfinals advanced to the semifinals.

Quarterfinal 1

Quarterfinal 2

Quarterfinal 3

Quarterfinal 4

Semifinals
The top two finishers in each of the two semifinals qualified for the A final, while the third and fourth place skaters advanced to the B Final.

Semifinal 1

Semifinal 2

Finals
The four qualifying skaters competed in Final A, while four others raced for 5th place in Final B.

Final A

Final B

References

Men's short track speed skating at the 1994 Winter Olympics